The 1984 BC Lions finished in first place in the West Division with a 12–3–1 record. They appeared in the West Final.

Joe Kapp and Tom Brown were inducted into the Football Hall of Fame.

Offseason

CFL Draft

Preseason

Regular season

Season standings
Source:

Season schedule
Source:

Awards and records
 CFL's Most Outstanding Defensive Player Award – James "Quick" Parker (DE)

1984 CFL All-Stars
 WR – Mervyn Fernandez, CFL All-Star
 OT – John Blain, CFL All-Star
 K – Lui Passaglia, CFL All-Star
 DT – Mack Moore, CFL All-Star
 DE – James "Quick" Parker, CFL All-Star
 DB – Larry Crawford, CFL All-Star

Playoffs

West Final

References

BC Lions seasons
1984 Canadian Football League season by team
1984 in British Columbia